Wallaceina is a genus of parasitic flagellate protist belonging to the family Trypanosomatidae. This generic name is a replacement name for Proteomonas Podlipaev, Frolov et Kolesnikov, 1990 because the latter Proteomonas was already attributed to a cryptomonad. Wallaceina is a taxonomic patronym honoring the protistologist Franklin G. Wallace, a pioneer in the modern taxonomy of trypanosomatids.

Wallaceina is a monoxenous parasite of insects. Other one-host trypanosomatids from hemipteran and dipteran insects have been traditionally placed in genera Blastocrithidia, Crithidia, Leptomonas, Herpetomonas, and Rhynchoidomonas. Wallaceina is characterized by endomastigote morphological forms, whereas 
epimastigotes and opisthomastigotes are features of the genera Blastocrithidia and Herpetomonas, respectively.

Comparison and phylogenetic analysis of 18S ribosomal RNA and glycosomal glyceraldehyde-3-phosphatedehydrogenase sequences of trypanosomatid taxa indicate that the genus Wallaceina is polyphyletic. It is therefore suggested to reassign Wallaceina species either to Crithidia brevicula (for Wallaceina brevicula, W. inconstans, W. vicina, and W. podlipaevi) or to the newly proposed genus Wallacemonas (for Wallaceina collosoma, W. rigida, and W. raviniae).

References

Trypanosomatida
Parasitic excavates
Euglenozoa genera